Storbreatinden is a mountain in Lom Municipality in Innlandet county, Norway. The mountain is surrounded by several other notable mountains including Loftet, Veslfjelltinden, and Veslbreatinden to the north; Sauhøi and Storbreahøe to the east; Rundhøe to the southeast; and Sokse, Veslebjørn, Storebjørn, Kniven, and Store Smørstabbtinden to the south.

See also
List of mountains of Norway by height

References

Jotunheimen
Lom, Norway
Mountains of Innlandet